WPMW (88.5 FM; "Radio CorMariae") is a radio station licensed to serve Bayview, Massachusetts. WPMW is owned by the Academy of the Immaculate, Inc. and airs a Catholic religious format. WPMW is an affiliate of EWTN radio.

External links

Radio stations established in 2011
2011 establishments in Massachusetts
Catholic radio stations
Mass media in Bristol County, Massachusetts
Dartmouth, Massachusetts
PMW